Mladen Stoev (born 26 January 1984) is a Bulgarian football coach and former footballer.

References

Bulgarian footballers
1984 births
Living people
First Professional Football League (Bulgaria) players
FC Lokomotiv 1929 Sofia players
PFC Spartak Varna players
FC Dunav Ruse players
PFC Lokomotiv Mezdra players
OFC Vihren Sandanski players
PFC Minyor Pernik players
FC Sportist Svoge players
PFC Dobrudzha Dobrich players
FC Lyubimets players
Association football midfielders